The Barents Sea campaign in 1941 was a submarine operation in the Arctic waters of the Barents Sea during World War II. It was a combined Soviet and British campaign, with boats departing from Polyarny to harass German shipping along the Norwegian coast.

Background 
At the beginning of war, the Soviet Navy ( [VMF, Military Maritime Fleet of the USSR]) operated fifteen submarines from Polyarny near Murmansk, later augmented by eight vessels of the Baltic Fleet. The Royal Navy attempted to attack German shipping which rounded the North Cape, bound for Petsamo but routine surface ship patrols could not be maintained and Operation EF (30 July 1941) an attack by aircraft carriers on the northern Norwegian port of Kirkenes and the north Finnish port of Liinakhamari in Petsamo was something of a fiasco. The submarines were to attack the German coastal traffic and by the end of September the Soviet Navy had eleven submarines operating in the same area.

Actions 
 On 17 August, British submarine Tigris torpedoed and sank the Norwegian merchant ship "Haakon Jarl" (1,482 GRT)
 On 19 August, British submarine Trident damaged the German freighter "Levante" (4,769 GRT) with gunfire
 On 22 August, British submarine Trident torpedoed and sank the German merchantman "Ostpreussen" (3,030 GRT)
 On 30 August, British submarine Trident torpedoed and sank the German merchant ships "Donau" (2,931 GRT) and "Bahia Laura" (8,561 GRT)
 On 12 September, the Soviet submarine ShCh-422 torpedoed and sank the Norwegian merchant ship "Ottar Jarl" (1459 GRT)
 On 13 September, British submarine Tigris torpedoed and sank the Norwegian merchant ship "Richard With" (905 GRT). On 25 September the Soviet submarines K-3, S-101 and S-102 reached Molotovsk (now Severodvinsk) from Belomorsk, having sailed from the Baltic via the White Sea Canal and arrived at Polyarny in October and November; L-20 and L-22 remained temporarily in the White Sea.
 On 27 September, British submarine Trident torpedoed and sank, the Kriegsmarine submarine chaser UJ-1201 while it was in convoy
 On 17 October, the Soviet submarine ShCh-402 torpedoed and sank the Norwegian merchant ship "Vesteraalen"(682 GRT).
 On 3 November, British submarine Trident torpedoed and sank the Kriegsmarine submarine chaser UJ-1213/
 On 18 November, British submarine Seawolf torpedoed and sank the Norwegian tanker "Vesco" (331 GRT)
 On 3 December, the Soviet submarine K-3 missed with torpedoes the German merchant ship "Altkirch" (4713 GRT): she was subjected to depth charges and damaged by escort. Forced to surface, the submarine engaged in gun battle with the submarine chasers "UJ-1403", "UJ-1416" and "UJ-1708". During the fight, "UJ-1708" was sunk and the other vessels fled allowing K-3 to return to base.
 On 5 December, British submarine Seawolf torpedoed and sank the Norwegian merchant ship "Island" (638 GRT).
 On 9 December,  Soviet submarine K-22 mined  (Rolvsøy Sound) and on 11 December shelled a Norwegian cutter, which escaped and sank several fishing vessels being towed off Mylingen.

Minelayer submarines

The ocean-going Soviet K-class submarine K-1 laid a minefield off the North Cape on 27 October. Between 2 and 12 November, K-1 laid minefields in Mageroysund and Breisund.
On the first and third fields sunk respectively:
 German merchant "Flottbek" (1930 GRT)
 Norwegian merchant "Kong Ring" (1994 GRT)

Soviet submarine K-23 of the oceanic K class laid minefields in Sørøysund and off Hammerfest on 5 November.
 These mines were responsible for damaging the German minesweeper M-22 on 21 November.

Soviet submarine K-21 of the ocean-going K class laid a minefield on 11 November.
 On these mines was sunk German merchant "Bessheim" (1774 GRT).

Aftermath 
The Soviet results achieved from the campaign were modest, despite losing no vessel, the Soviet submarine effort was hampered by the harsh Arctic climate and inexperience, in contrast with the British vessels, which gained more success. The  lacked the escorts adequately to protect the coastal traffic, which was vital to German army units operating in the far north and was stopped by the British–Soviet campaign. The Germans had to send supplies through the Baltic Sea and overland through Finland, substantially hampering German land operations in the far north. The British officers instructed the Soviet submarine D-3 to follow their own tactics but despite many victories claimed, none was real.

Notes

Footnotes

References

 
 
 
 
 

Naval battles of World War II involving Germany
Naval battles of World War II involving the Soviet Union
Naval battles and operations of World War II involving the United Kingdom